Batch process may refer to:

 Batch processing (computing)
 Batch production (manufacturing)